The following is an episode list for Marvel Anime, a four-part series of anime shows as part of a collaboration between Marvel Entertainment and Madhouse. The four series are based on Iron Man, Wolverine, X-Men and Blade. These series had their debut in Japan on Animax, and are airing in North America on G4 and in Australia on Sci Fi. The first series, Iron Man aired in Japan between October 1, 2010 and December 17, 2010. The second series, Wolverine, aired in Japan between January 7, 2011 and March 25, 2011. Both series aired in English on G4 between July 23, 2011, and October 14, 2011. The third series, X-Men, aired in Japan between April 1, 2011 and June 24, 2011 and aired in English on G4 from October 21, 2011, to January 6, 2012. The fourth and final series, Blade, aired in Japan between July 1, 2011 and September 16, 2011, and aired in English on G4 from January 13, 2012, to April 2, 2012.

Iron Man

Wolverine

X-Men

Blade

References

Marvel Anime
Marvel Anime
Blade (comics) in other media
Wolverine (comics) in other media